is a passenger railway station in located in the city of Wakayama, Wakayama Prefecture, Japan, operated by the private railway company Wakayama Electric Railway.

Lines
Sandō Station is served by the Kishigawa Line, and is located 9.1 kilometers from the terminus of the line at Wakayama Station.

Station layout
The station consists of one side platform serving a single bi-directional track. There is no station building and the station is unattended.

Adjacent stations

History
It was renamed to its present name in 1945. The station building was demolished in 1997.

Passenger statistics

Surrounding Area
Wakayama City Hall Higashiyama Higashi Branch
 Wakayama City Higashiyama Higashi Elementary School

See also
List of railway stations in Japan

References

External links
 
  Sandō Station timetable

Railway stations in Japan opened in 1933
Railway stations in Wakayama Prefecture
Wakayama (city)